Your Face Sounds Familiar (Spanish: Tu cara me suena) is a Spanish interactive reality television franchise series where celebrity contestants impersonate singers. The format, similar to Dutch  television series Soundmixshow, was first used in Spain under the title Tu cara me suena in 2011.

Format 

The show challenges celebrities to perform as different iconic music artists every week, which are chosen by the show's "Randomiser". They are then judged by the panel of celebrity judges.

Each celebrity becomes transformed into a different singer each week, and performs an iconic song and dance routine well known by that particular singer. The 'randomiser' can choose any older or younger artist available in the machine, or even a singer of the opposite sex, or a deceased singer.

The contestants are awarded points from the judges based on their singing and dance routines. After the jury vote, the contestants have to give a set of points to a fellow contestant of their choice. The total score of each contestant is counted by summing the points from judges and contestant's voting. In case of a tie, the judges will choose the weeks winner.

Whoever is at the top of the leaderboard at the end of the each show receives a cash prize for a charity of their choice and a further grand prize for the "series champion".

International versions 
Since the format debuted in Spain, there have been more than 47 versions worldwide (as of December 2016).

Legend
 Airing
 Not airing
 Upcoming
 Original version (Spain)
 Talent version (Spain)
 Kids version (Portugal)

See also 
Soundmixshow – similar concept that debuted in the Netherlands in 1985, on KRO.
Stars in Their Eyes – British adaptation of Soundmixshow, originally  from 1990 to 2006, on ITV.

References 

 
Banijay franchises
Television franchises
Singing talent shows